Corbett School is a K-12 public school in Corbett, Oregon, United States. In 2010, Corbett School was ranked 5th among public schools in the United States by Newsweek, as measured by the proportion of students who passed college prep courses.  In 2011, it was ranked 15th by The Washington Post.

Academics
In 2008, 90% of the school's seniors received their high school diploma. Of 41 students, 37 graduated, 2 dropped out, 1 part-time home school student and 1 received a modified diploma.

References

High schools in Multnomah County, Oregon
Public high schools in Oregon
Public elementary schools in Oregon
Public middle schools in Oregon